Tentacles of Whorror is the second full-length album by Leviathan. It was recorded at L.D. 50 Productions between December 2003 and January 2004 with production mastering being handled by Drucifer at Nettlingham Audio. It was released on June 16, 2004 and was distributed by Seattle-based underground record label Moribund Cult. It features lyrics by Maija the Goatess on the track "A Necessary Mutilation".

Track listing

References

2004 albums
Leviathan (musical project) albums
Profound Lore Records albums